Elmo Adab Mashhad Futsal Club (Persian: باشگاه فوتسال علم و ادب مشهد) was an Iranian Futsal club based in Mashhad, Iran. "Elm" means Science and "Adab" means Politeness. Elmo Adab FSC has been awarded a number of different moral titles such as the Morality Cup of the League, and the national title of premier moral club manager.

Established in 1997, this club commenced its activity as the Seiro Safar club, later in 2004 the club title was changed to Elmo Adab. Also, in 2007–08, 2008–09, 2010–11, and the beginning of 2011–12, the club was operated under the sponsorship of Saipa Cultural and Athletic Corporation as the Elmo Adab of Saipa club.
In mid-2011, the Elmo Adab futsal club was hired temporarily by the Farsh Ara Mashhad FSC.

Season-by-season 
The table below chronicles the achievements of the Club in various competitions.

Notes:
* unofficial titles
1 worst title in history of club

Key

P   = Played
W   = Games won
D   = Games drawn
L   = Games lost

GF  = Goals for
GA  = Goals against
Pts = Points
Pos = Final position

Players

First-team squad 2011-12

Former players 
For details on former players, see :Category:Elmo Adab FSC players.

Famous players 
  Hossein Tayyebi
  Mahdi Javid
  Mohammad Reza Heidarian
  Mohsen Hassanzadeh
  Esmaeil Abbasian
  Hamid Ahmadi (futsal)
  Mohammad Hashemzadeh
  Mostafa Tayyebi
  Ghodrat Bahadori
  Mohammad Reza Zahmatkesh

Honors 
National:
 Local League
 Runners-up (1): 2003–04
 Iran Futsal's 1st Division
 Champions (1): 2004–05

References

External links
 Official website

Elmo Adab FSC
Futsal clubs in Iran
Sport in Mashhad
Defunct futsal clubs in Iran
Futsal clubs established in 1997
1997 establishments in Iran
2011 disestablishments in Iran